The 2009–10 Austrian Hockey League was a season of the Austrian Hockey League (known as Erste Bank Eishockey Liga (or EBEL league) for sponsorship reasons).

Regular season - final standings

Playoffs (Best of seven)

External links

Austrian Hockey League seasons
Aus
1
Aus
2009–10 in Hungarian ice hockey
2009–10 in Croatian ice hockey